The following is a list of episodes from the 1970s/1980s TV series Laverne & Shirley.



Series overview

Episodes

Season 1 (1976)

Season 2 (1976–77)

Season 3 (1977–78)

Season 4 (1978–79)

Season 5 (1979–80)

Season 6 (1980–81)

Season 7 (1981–82)

Season 8 (1982–83)

Reunion specials

See also
 List of Happy Days episodes—includes part 1 of "Shotgun Wedding".

Notelist

References

Laverne and Shirley